Batıköy is a village in the District of Didim, Aydın Province, Turkey. As of 2010, it had a population of 198 people.

References

Villages in Didim District